Wong Kei is a Chinese restaurant in London's Chinatown, once described as "the rudest restaurant in London". It is one of the largest Chinese restaurants in the UK with seating for around 500 diners.

Restaurant
Wong Kei was once known for the rudeness of its staff, who would shout "Sit down with them!" or "Go upstairs!" to arriving patrons, insult customers who asked for a knife and fork, and chase those who failed to leave a sufficient tip. This aspect was seen as a positive and enjoyable feature rather than a criticism of the restaurant. After a renovation, the restaurant reopened in 2001 with friendlier waiters, and when it reopened under new management in March 2014, new owner Daniel Luc said: "Maybe there was an issue with rude staff 20 to 30 years ago, but I don't think so any more. I don't know whether that's a good thing or not."

Building
Wong Kei originally occupied two shops on nearby Rupert Court but is currently situated at 41–43 Wardour Street. This building was originally built by Willy Clarkson (1861–1934), at the time a well-known theatrical wig-maker and costumier. It was designed by the architect H. M. Wakeley in a mixed Baroque and Art Nouveau style. Sarah Bernhardt laid the foundation stone in 1904 and Sir Henry Irving laid the coping stone in 1905. 

Clarkson's business operated there from 1905 until it ceased trading in 1940. The building retains an original clock over the entrance, advertising it as the premises of a Costumer and Perruquier (one who makes and sells wigs). In 1966, a blue plaque was fixed to the façade to commemorate Clarkson.

When Terence Dalley sketched the building in 1972, another Chinese restaurant, Lee Ho Fook, occupied the ground floor.

See also
 List of Chinese restaurants

References

External links 

 History of the Building and Clarkson's Wigs

1905 establishments in England
Art Nouveau architecture in London
Art Nouveau commercial buildings
Art Nouveau restaurants
Chinatown, London
Chinese restaurants in London
Commercial buildings completed in 1905
Grade II listed buildings in the City of Westminster
Tourist attractions in the City of Westminster